Disney XD is a Dutch free-to-air children's television channel owned by The Walt Disney Company. It broadcasts 14 hours a day, time-sharing with Dutch TV station Veronica, and is primarily aimed at children roughly between the ages of 7 and 15. The channel used to have a pay television 24-hour feed that was distributed throughout the Netherlands and Belgium (Flanders); however, it was closed down on 31 July 2018. Viewers in Belgium (Wallonia) and Luxembourg received Disney XD France, until that feed was later shut down in 2020.

All series on the channel air in Dutch, either dubbed or originally produced in that language. However, the 24-hour feed of the network used to offer an optional English audio track for most programming. Dutch subtitles were distributed through teletext-page 888, as there is currently no DVB subtitle track available.

Prior to its aforementioned shutdown near the end of July 2018, the 24-hour version of Disney XD used to broadcast certain shows in English subtitled in Dutch, mainly in the evening and night.

History
Disney XD was first launched as Fox Kids in the Netherlands on 2 August 1997 and later it expanded its coverage area to Belgium. Saban International bought Dutch free-to-air television network TV10 in January 1997 and started broadcasting Fox Kids, a joint venture with Rupert Murdoch's News Corporation later on in that same year, making TV10 and Fox Kids a time-sharing channel on terrestrial television; in the daytime it was Fox Kids, and at night TV10.

In 2001 Saban wanted to sell its share in Fox Kids to the News Corporation. In the end, Murdoch decided to sell Fox Kids to The Walt Disney Company so he would have the cash to acquire DirecTV. Fox Kids was rebranded as Jetix on 13 February 2005, now time-sharing with Veronica.

On 1 January 2010, the Dutch Jetix channel was rebranded as Disney XD, making it the last Jetix feed to be relaunched under that brand in Europe. One month later, a 24-hours feed of the channel was launched as a pay television network.

In 2012, Disney extensively promoted the 24-hours feed in magazines like Donald Duck and Tina under the banner of "Disney XD Extra". It featured extra programming added after 6:00 PM, when the free-to-air feed closed down to timeshare with Veronica.

In 25 March 2015, Disney XD launched an HD simulcast of the 24-hours feed of the channel, which was available at the time on KPN, XS4All and Telfort.

The 24-hours feed closed on 31 July 2018. Due to this, the channel ceased broadcasting on Belgian carriers. The free-to-air channel time-sharing with Veronica continues to remain available, but only in the Netherlands. As a consequence, there is no optional English audio track anymore, due to that only being available on 24-hour feed.

Alongside the Polish and Canadian versions of Disney XD, the Dutch version of Disney XD is one of the three last remaining Disney XD feeds broadcasting outside the U.S., as of April 2022.

References

External links
Official website

Disney XD
Children's television networks
Television channels in the Netherlands
Television channels and stations established in 1997
1997 establishments in the Netherlands